Richford may refer to:

Places

Canada
Richford, Edmonton, Alberta

United States
 Richford, New York, a town
 Richford, Vermont, a town
 Richford (CDP), Vermont, the main settlement in the town
 East Richford, Vermont, an unincorporated community
 Richford, Wisconsin, a town
 Richford (community), Wisconsin, an unincorporated community